Temporal power is a term of art in medieval and early modern political philosophy to refer to worldly power, as contrasted with spiritual power.

 The temporal power (simply), the state (polity) or secular authority, in contrast to the church or spiritual authority
 Temporal power (papal), the worldly power exercised by the Roman Pontiff